Without You Near is the debut album by Markus Schulz, released on October 9, 2005.

Track listing

References

2005 debut albums
Trance albums
Armada Music albums